Daniel Stoljar (born 1967) is an Australian philosopher and Professor of Philosophy at the Australian National University. He was the President of the Australasian Association of Philosophy (2016–2017). Stoljar is known for his works on physicalism and philosophical progress.

Books
 Ignorance and imagination (2006)
 Physicalism (2010)
 Philosophical Progress: In Defence of a Reasonable Optimism (2017)

References

External links
 Personal Website
 Daniel Stoljar at the ANU
 Stoljar, Daniel and Damnjanovic, Nic (2007), "The Deflationary Theory of Truth", Stanford Encyclopedia of Philosophy, Edward N. Zalta (ed.).

Australian philosophers
Analytic philosophers
Philosophy academics
Living people
1967 births
Metaphysicians
Philosophers of mind
Academic staff of the Australian National University